In Mandaeism, Giu is a demon in the World of Darkness (alma ḏ-hšuka) or underworld. Hibil Ziwa encounters Giu during his descent to the World of Darkness in Chapter 1 of Book 5 in the Right Ginza.

References

Demons in Mandaeism